Catocala abamita is a moth of the family Erebidae. It is found in Northern China, South-eastern Siberia and on the Korean Peninsula.

The wingspan is about 79 mm.

References

External links
Species info
Catocala of Asia

abamita
Moths of Asia
Moths described in 1853